Markus Kranz (born 4 August 1969 in Speyer) is a German football coach and a former player.

Honours
1. FC Kaiserslautern
 Bundesliga: 1990–91
 DFB-Pokal: 1989–90

References

External links
 

1969 births
Living people
German footballers
Association football midfielders
Germany under-21 international footballers
1. FC Kaiserslautern players
KFC Uerdingen 05 players
Dynamo Dresden players
SC Fortuna Köln players
FC Emmen players
VfR Mannheim players
Bundesliga players
2. Bundesliga players
German expatriate footballers
German expatriate sportspeople in the Netherlands
Expatriate footballers in the Netherlands
People from Speyer
Footballers from Rhineland-Palatinate